Honoratus:
 Honoratus (praefectus urbi 359), Praefectus urbi of Constantinople in 359 - 361
 Honoratus (praefectus urbi 394), Praefectus urbi of Constantinople in 394
 Honoratus of Arles, 5th-century saint
 Honoratus of Amiens, 7th-century saint